"It's So Easy!" is a rock-and-roll song written by Buddy Holly and Norman Petty. It was originally released as a single in 1958 by the Crickets but failed to chart. It was the final release by the Crickets when Holly was still in the band.

A cover version recorded by Linda Ronstadt was released on September 20, 1977 and was a Top Five hit on the Billboard Hot 100.

The Crickets version

Background
The song was recorded by Holly and the Crickets from June to August 1958 at Norman Petty's studio in Clovis, New Mexico.

Holly lip-synched to recordings of "It's So Easy!" and his song "Heartbeat" on the television program American Bandstand on October 28, 1958.

The Crickets recorded "It's So Easy!" for Brunswick Records, which released it as a 45-rpm single in 1958. It did not chart. The B-side was "Lonesome Tears".  Tommy Allsup played the lead guitar parts on both recordings.

Linda Ronstadt version

Background
Linda Ronstadt recorded "It's So Easy" in 1977 for her album Simple Dreams, produced by Peter Asher. Her recording was released as a single by Asylum Records in the autumn of that year. It  hit the Billboard Top Five simultaneously with her recording of "Blue Bayou". It also reached No. 9 in Canada and No. 11 in the United Kingdom. Ronstadt's version was used in the 2005 film Brokeback Mountain.

Chart performance

Weekly charts

Year-end charts

Other versions
Bobby Vee, the Astronauts, Skeeter Davis, the Trashmen, Connie Francis, Hank Marvin, Mike Berry and the Outlaws, P.J. Proby, and Chris Spedding recorded cover versions of the song.

The Beatles performed the song at the 1969 Let It Be sessions.
 
Gary Busey performed the song in the 1978 film The Buddy Holly Story.

References

Sources
Amburn, Ellis (1996). Buddy Holly: A Biography. St. Martin's Press. .
Bustard, Anne (2005). Buddy: The Story of Buddy Holly. Simon & Schuster. .
Dawson, Jim; Leigh, Spencer (1996). Memories of Buddy Holly. Big Nickel Publications. .
Gerron, Peggy Sue (2008). Whatever Happened to Peggy Sue? Togi Entertainment. .
Goldrosen, John (1975). Buddy Holly: His Life and Music. Popular Press. .
Goldrosen, John; Beecher, John (1996). Remembering Buddy: The Definitive Biography. New York: Da Capo Press. .
Gribbin, John (2009). Not Fade Away: The Life and Music of Buddy Holly. London: Icon Books. .

External links
 
 

1958 singles
1977 singles
Buddy Holly songs
Brunswick Records singles
Linda Ronstadt songs
Song recordings produced by Peter Asher
Songs written by Buddy Holly
Songs written by Norman Petty
1958 songs
Asylum Records singles
The Crickets songs